Henry Stanley "Hank" Nowak (born November 24, 1950 in Oshawa, Ontario) is a |Canadian retired professional ice hockey player. He played 180 games in the National Hockey League with the Pittsburgh Penguins, Detroit Red Wings, and Boston Bruins between 1973 and 1977. The rest of his career, which lasted from 1970 to 1980, was spent in the minor leagues.

Playing career
Hank Nowak played left-wing for three different teams throughout the 1970s. He was a disciplined checker, a useful grinder with a muscular build who could contribute occasionally to the scoring.

Nowak spent two years with the Oshawa Generals of the OHA. Chosen 87th overall by the Flyers in the 1970 NHL Amateur Draft, he was assigned to the Quebec Aces. He also played with the Richmond Robins and Hershey Bears, and was then was traded to the Pittsburgh Penguins.

After 13 games with the Pens in 1973-74, he spent most of the season in Hershey, scoring 32 goals in 56 games. In May 1974, Nowak was traded to Detroit for Nelson Debenedet. Nowak scored 22 points in 56 games for the Wings, but then he was traded to Boston with Earl Anderson for Walt McKechnie. In the 1975 NHL playoffs, Nowak scored one goal. In 1975-76, he played 10 games for Boston when they reached the Stanley Cup semifinals.

On February 7, 1976, Nowak played in Darryl Sittler's NHL record-setting game when Boston played the Toronto Maple Leafs. This was the night that Sittler set an NHL record for most points scored in one game when he recorded ten points (six goals, four assists). Nowak claims that despite the 11-4 loss that night he was still +3!

Nowak retired from competitive hockey in 1980. He went on to work for the Toronto Transit Commission. He is currently retired from the TTC.

Hank Nowak was playing occasionally in the ASHL for the 'Toronto Blue Hogs.' He played occasionally in tournaments with some Blue Hog alumni and his son Clinton.

Career statistics

Regular season and playoffs

External links
 

1950 births
Living people
Binghamton Dusters players
Boston Bruins players
Canadian ice hockey left wingers
Detroit Red Wings players
Hershey Bears players
Ice hockey people from Ontario
Oshawa Generals players
Philadelphia Firebirds (AHL) players
Philadelphia Flyers draft picks
Pittsburgh Penguins players
Quebec Aces (AHL) players
Richmond Robins players
Rochester Americans players
Saginaw Gears players
Sportspeople from Oshawa
Toledo Goaldiggers players